John Ferguson (22 June 1848 – 6 September 1929) was a Scottish footballer who played for Vale of Leven and the Scottish national team, in the very early days of Scottish football in the 1870s.

Previously a noted shinty player and sprinter, Ferguson joined Vale of Leven in 1872. He played as a forward for their great team which won the Scottish Cup three times in 1877, 1878 and 1879. In 1878, after doing so, they travelled down to England and beat Wanderers F.C., the FA Cup winners, 3-1. Although an important game in a way, the match was not advertised, and they had not decided beforehand whether to use the Scottish or English throw-in rule.

He played for Scotland six times (three times each against England and Wales) and scored a total of five goals.

In later years he ran a pub in Kilmarnock.

References
The Old Vale and its Memories
Rothman's Football Yearbook
Cavallini The Wanderers F.C.

External links 

London Hearts profile
article on the Vale team including a photo of him

1848 births
1929 deaths
Scotland international footballers
People from Alexandria, West Dunbartonshire
Vale of Leven F.C. players
Association football wingers
Scottish footballers
Footballers from West Dunbartonshire